The Goya Award for Best Actor (Spanish: Premio Goya a la mejor interpretación masculina protagonista) is one of the Goya Awards, Spain's principal national film awards.

Actors that won or were nominated for this category have had a significant presence in several film festivals both Spanish and international, Imanol Arias (Lute: Run for Your Life), Fernando Rey (Winter Diary), Juan Echanove (Madregilda), Luis Tosar (Take My Eyes), Juan José Ballesta (7 Virgins), Juan Diego (Go Away from Me), José Sacristán (The Dead Man and Being Happy), Javier Gutiérrez (Marshland), Ricardo Darín (Truman) and Eduard Fernández (Smoke & Mirrors) received the Silver Shell for Best Actor at the San Sebastián International Film Festival, Juan Luis Galiardo (Goodbye from the Heart), Javier Cámara (Torremolinos 73, Chef's Special) and Alberto San Juan (Under the Stars) received the Best Actor award at the Málaga Film Festival, Javier Bardem received the Volpi Cup for Best Actor at the Venice Film Festival for The Sea Inside and Benicio del Toro won Best Actor at the Cannes Film Festival for Che I: The Argentine.

Javier Bardem and Antonio Banderas won this category and were nominated for the Academy Award for Best Actor, for Biutiful and Pain and Glory respectively.

In the list below the winner of the award for each year is shown first, followed by the other nominees.

Winners and nominees

1980s

1990s

2000s

2010s

2020s

Multiple nominations 
The following 16 winners of the Goya Award for Best Actor have received multiple nominations for the award.

References

External links 
Official site
IMDb: Goya Awards

Actor
Film awards for lead actor